IrisVision is an expansion card developed by Silicon Graphics for IBM compatible PCs in 1991 and is one of the first 3D accelerator cards available for the high end PC market. IrisVision is an adaptation of the graphics pipeline from the Personal IRIS workstation to the Micro Channel architecture and consumer ISA buses of most modern PCs of the day. It has the first variant of IRIS GL ported to the PC, predating OpenGL.

History
In 1988, Silicon Graphics introduced the MIPS-based workstation computer, the Personal IRIS series. A few years later, IBM licensed both the graphics subsystem and the (then new) IRIS Graphics Library (IRIS GL) API for their RS/6000 POWERstation line of POWER1-based workstations. IrisVision was an unintended offshoot of SGI's attempts to port the subsystem to IBM's Micro Channel Architecture. They found it was much easier to debug the prototype implementations on an IBM PS/2.

To quote R.C. Brown:

The IrisVision was spun off as Pellucid, which later was taken over by Media Vision.

Overview

Not unlike its Personal IRIS variant, IrisVision is capable of 8-bit and 24-bit raster images with a 24-bit Z buffer. The difference is in integration with a fifth generation Geometry Engine without having to upgrade the cards. Around the same time, SGI was preparing to introduce the next series of graphics cards for its IRIS Indigo workstations, called "Express Graphics", which came in two variants for the Personal IRIS: Turbo Graphix and the Elan Graphics pipeline, both of them an evolution of IrisVision.

At this time, SGI was moving forward to 64-bit microprocessors on its own platform. To take advantage of the 80386 and 80486's 32-bit extensions and to enable large memory up to 2 GB, IrisVision came with a proprietary 32-bit C compiler and the PharLap 32-bit DOS extender. Due to the nature of the pipeline, all execution calls to IRIS GL are displayed in full screen. MS-DOS has no GUI, so this left programmers to write their interfaces in pure IRIS GL.

3D graphics hardware was a relatively new prospect for microcomputers at the time, and was unknown in the IBM personal computing world. 3D graphics software was mostly associated with PowerAnimator and Softimage or niche applications on the Amiga 3000, such as Video Toaster and Lightwave, or the Macintosh Quadra, such as StrataVision, and 3D graphics hardware was frequently associated with UNIX machines. In contrast, in the IBM personal computing world, VGA was just barely coming into the spotlight when IrisVision came out on the market. IrisVision presented an alternative few had ever imagined on the Intel platform: that of a 3D platform that used MS-DOS as the base operating system.

AutoDesk quickly realized that it could capitalize on this graphics subsystem and released their most successful CAD and 3D production products with support for this card, among them AutoCAD (Revisions 12 and 13) and 3D studio 2 through 4. Eventually support for Microsoft Windows would be developed but hardly any software on the GUI system would take advantage of the card.

IrisVision fell into relative obscurity, as IRIS GL hadn't reached its pinnacle as the default 3D API then was PHIGS, and few people had any real idea of what to do with 3D graphics (outside of the CAD industry). Another attempt to port SGI hardware to the PC platform would not occur until the introduction of the SGI Visual Workstation.

See also 
 Elan Graphics
 Extreme Graphics - Supplanted Express Graphics cards
 IMPACT (computer graphics) - Supplanted Extreme Graphics cards
 SGI VPro - First present on the Octane2 and continued on to Fuel and Tezro Platforms
 Quadro - Nvidia cards for SGI PC-based workstations

References

External links
 The Very Unofficial IrisVision Homepage : More indepth information
 Computer Chronicles 1990: Time index 25:15, soundbyte with information on the IrisVision's introduction at Comdex.
 SGI IrisVision Description : Short Description on archived trademarks page.

Computer-related introductions in 1991
SGI graphics
Graphics cards